Samuel John Kydd (15 February 1915 – 26 March 1982) was a British-Irish actor. His best-known roles were in two major British television series of the 1960s, as the smuggler Orlando O'Connor in Crane and its sequel Orlando. He also played a recurring character in Coronation Street. Kydd's first film was The Captive Heart (1946), in which he played a POW. He made over 290 films, more than any other British actor, including 119 between 1946 and 1952.

Early life and career
An army officer's son, Kydd was born on 15 February 1915 in Belfast, Ireland, and moved to London as a child. He was educated at Dunstable School in Dunstable, Bedfordshire. During the mid-1930s Kydd was an MC for the Oscar Rabin Band and one of his "Hot Shots". He would warm up audiences with jokes and impressions (Maurice Chevalier was a favourite) and even some tap dance routines then introduce the other singers and attractions on the bill. During the late 1930s he had joined the Territorial Army serving with the Queen Victoria's Rifles and when war broke out he was called up for active service.

Early in the Second World War, he went to France with the British Expeditionary Force but was quickly captured, spending the rest of the war in Stalag XX-A, a camp near Thorn in German-occupied western Poland. Kydd later wrote of his experiences as a POW in his autobiographical book For You the War Is Over.

During his internment in the German prisoner-of-war camp, where he remained for the next five years, he took command of the camp's theatrical activities - devising and staging plays. He felt so strongly about his work there that, when he was offered repatriation after three years, he turned it down to continue with his theatrical work. In recognition of his valuable services during these years he was awarded a pair of drama masks, made by the Red Cross from barbed wire.

Career
Returning to Britain after the war, Kydd applied for the film The Captive Heart, which was about life in a prison camp, and as this was an area where he had much experience, he got a part as an advisor cum actor. He went on to appear in more than 290 films and 1,000 TV plays and series, including such films as The Blue Lamp, Father Brown, The 39 Steps and I'm All Right Jack. He often played the part of a strong and resilient cockney. He is best remembered as a character actor in films such as Chance of a Lifetime, The Cruel Sea, Sink the Bismarck!, The Yangtse Incident, Reach for the Sky, The Hound of the Baskervilles, Too Many Crooks, Smokescreen, Island of Terror, Too Late the Hero, Eye of the Needle and Steptoe and Son Ride Again. He also appeared in the big-screen versions of Dad's Army and Till Death Us Do Part.

In 1963, Kydd appeared as the lovable smuggler Orlando O'Connor in Crane starring Patrick Allen as a Briton who moved to Morocco to run a cafe and had an aversion to smuggling. The programme ran for 39 episodes and was watched each week by over 16 million viewers. Sam's character was so popular that when Crane finished he was given his own programme, Orlando, a children's adventure series which ran for 126 episodes.

He also appeared on TV in The Adventures of Robin Hood, The Pickwick Papers, Mess Mates, Arthur Askey, Benny Hill, Charlie Drake, Harry Worth, The Expert, Dixon of Dock Green, Fossett Saga, Curry and Chips, The Tony Hancock Show, Minder, Crossroads, Coronation Street (playing the part of Mike Baldwin's father, Frankie), The Eric Sykes Show, and Follyfoot.

He was the subject of This Is Your Life in 1974 when he was surprised by Eamonn Andrews.

Personal life and death
He married Pinkie Barnes, an ex-international table tennis champion (she was World Doubles Finalist in 1948) and one of Britain's first women advertising copywriters. Their son, Jonathan Kydd, followed his father into the acting profession.

Sam Kydd died of emphysema on 26 March 1982, aged 67. His son Jonathan Kydd reported that his father smoked up to 80 cigarettes a day, and he has edited 4 volumes of his father’s memoirs, the first of which is 'Be a Good Boy Sam' 1945-52

Selected filmography

 The Captive Heart (1946) as POW in Top Bunk (uncredited)
 They Made Me a Fugitive (1947) as Eddie (uncredited)
 Fortune Lane (1947) (uncredited)
 Frieda (1947) as ex-P.O.W.
 A Song for Tomorrow (1948) as Sergeant
 To the Public Danger (1948) as Police Driver
 Colonel Bogey (1948) as Bit Role (uncredited)
 Love in Waiting (1948) as Bit Part (uncredited)
 It's Hard to Be Good (1948) as Husband (uncredited)
 Scott of the Antarctic (1948) as Leading Stoker E. McKenzie R.N.
 A Piece of Cake (1948) as Uncredited (uncredited)
 The Small Back Room (1949) as Crowhurst, door sentry
 Once a Jolly Swagman (1949) as Johnny Briggs (uncredited)
 Portrait from Life (1949) as Army Truck Driver
 Forbidden (1949) as Joe
 Badger's Green (1949) as Uncredited (uncredited)
 Floodtide (1949) as Barman (uncredited)
 Passport to Pimlico (1949) as Sapper
 Stop Press Girl (1949) as Railway Ticket Clerk (uncredited)
 Vengeance Is Mine (1949) as Stacey
 Poet's Pub (1949) as George (uncredited)
 Obsession (1949) as Club steward
 Trottie True (1949) as 'Bedford' Stage Manager (uncredited)
 Saints and Sinners (1949) as Man in Bar (uncredited)
 Madness of the Heart (1949) as Soldier at airport
 The Hasty Heart (1949) as Driver (uncredited)
 The Cure for Love (1949) as Charlie Fox
 The Second Mate (1950) as Wheeler (uncredited)
 The Blue Lamp (1950) as Bookmakers Assistant White City (uncredited)
 Chance of a Lifetime (1950) as Worker
 Treasure Island (1950) as Cady
 Blackout (1950) (uncredited)
 No Trace (1950) as Mechanic
 Seven Days to Noon (1950) as Soldier in House Search (uncredited)
 Cage of Gold (1950) as Waiter (uncredited)
 The Magnet (1950) as Postman
 The Clouded Yellow (1950) as Police Radio Operator (uncredited)
 The Dark Man (1951) as Sergeant Major
 Mister Drake's Duck (1951) (uncredited)
 Pool of London (1951) as 2nd Engineer (uncredited)
 Assassin for Hire (1951) as Bert
 Captain Horatio Hornblower R.N. (1951) as Seaman Garvin (uncredited)
 Penny Points to Paradise (1951) as Porter / Taxi Driver
 The Galloping Major (1951) as Newspaper Vendor (uncredited)
 Hell Is Sold Out (1951) (uncredited)
 Cheer the Brave (1951)
 High Treason (1951) as Sam - Printer (uncredited)
 Mr. Denning Drives North (1951) as Minor Role (uncredited)
 Sing Along with Me (1952)
 Judgment Deferred (1952) (uncredited)
 Secret People (1952) as Irish Police Sergeant
 Hunted (1952) as Potman
 Angels One Five (1952) as Mess Waiter
 Curtain Up (1952) as Ambulanceman (uncredited)
 Brandy for the Parson (1952) as Lorry Driver
 Derby Day (1952) as Harry Bunn
 The Brave Don't Cry (1952) as Porter
 The Lost Hours (1952) as Fred - mechanic at Bristow & Brown
 The Hour of 13 (1952) as Reporter (uncredited)
 Trent's Last Case (1952) as Inspector Murch
 The Voice of Merrill (1952) as Sgt. Baker
 Hot Ice (1952) as Adams
 Time Bomb (1953) as Train Ticket Clerk (uncredited)
 Appointment in London (1953) as Ackroyd
 The Cruel Sea (1953) as Carslake
 The Titfield Thunderbolt (1953) as Policeman (uncredited)
 The Steel Key (1953) as Chauffeur
 Death Goes to School (1953) as Sergeant Harvey (uncredited)
 Single-Handed (1953) as Naval Rating (uncredited)
 Malta Story (1953) as Soldier (uncredited)
 The Master of Ballantrae (1953) (uncredited)
 The Saint's Return (1953) as Barkley (Joe Podd)
 Love in Pawn (1953) (uncredited)
 The End of the Road (1954) as First Postal Clerk
 Impulse (1954) as Ticket Inspector (uncredited)
 They Who Dare (1954) as Marine Boyd
 The Runaway Bus (1954) as Security Officer
 Devil on Horseback (1954) as Darky
 The Rainbow Jacket (1954) as Bruce
 Father Brown (1954) as Scotland Yard Sergeant
 The Embezzler (1954) as Railway Inspector (uncredited)
 The Young Lovers (1954) as Driver, Embassy car JAK711 (uncredited)
 Radio Cab Murder (1954) as George Spencer
 Final Appointment (1954) as Vickery
 Lilacs in the Spring (1954) as Actor in Beaumont Film (uncredited)
 The Glass Cage (1955) as George
 Raising a Riot (1955) as Messenger (credited as 'Sam Kidd')
 Where There's a Will (1955) as Jeep driver
 As Long as They're Happy (1955) as Milkman (uncredited)
 Passage Home (1955) as Sheltia
 The Dark Avenger (1955) as Minor Role (uncredited)
 The Constant Husband (1955) as Adelphi Barman (uncredited)
 A Kid for Two Farthings (1955) (uncredited)
 One Way Out (1955) as Gang Member (uncredited)
 The Quatermass Xperiment (1955) as Police sergeant questioning Rosie
 Josephine and Men (1955) as Desk Sergeant
 The Cockleshell Heroes (1955) as Uncredited (uncredited)
 The Ladykillers (1955) as Second Cab Driver (uncredited)
 Storm Over the Nile (1955) as Joe (uncredited)
 Portrait of Alison (1955) as Bill, the Telephone Engineer (uncredited)
 Soho Incident (aka Spin a Dark Web) (1956) as Sam
 A Town Like Alice (1956) (uncredited)
 Ramsbottom Rides Again (1956) (uncredited)
 It's Never Too Late (1956) (uncredited)
 The Long Arm (1956) as Police Constable in Information Room
 Jacqueline (1956) as Foreman
 Reach for the Sky (1956) as Warrant Officer Blake
 The Baby and the Battleship (1956) as Chief Steward (uncredited)
 It's a Wonderful World (1956) as Attendant
 Home and Away (1956) as Albert West
 Tiger in the Smoke (1956) as Tom Gripper
 You Can't Escape (1956) as Uncredited (uncredited)
 Yangtse Incident: The Story of H.M.S. Amethyst (1957) as AB Walker RN
 Carry On Admiral (1957) as Attendant
 The Long Haul (1957) as Taxi Driver (uncredited)
 The Scamp (1957) as Shopkeeper
 Just My Luck (1957) as Craftsman
 Barnacle Bill (1957) as Frogman
 Dangerous Exile (1957) (uncredited)
 A Tale of Two Cities (1958) as Joe—Coach Guard (uncredited)
 Happy Is the Bride (1958) as Foreman
 The Safecracker (1958) as McCullers
 Dunkirk (1958) as Bit Role (uncredited)
 Up the Creek (1958) as Bates
 Law and Disorder (1958) as Shorty
 Orders to Kill (1958)
 A Question of Adultery (1958) as Court Reporter
 I Was Monty's Double (1958) as Go-Between
 Further Up the Creek (1958) as Bates
 The Captain's Table (1959) as Sailor Opening Water Valve (uncredited)
 Make Mine a Million (1959) as Mail Van Robber (uncredited)
 Too Many Crooks (1959) as Tramp (uncredited)
 Carlton-Browne of the F.O. (1959) as Signaller
 The 39 Steps (1959) as Train Steward (uncredited)
 The Hound of the Baskervilles (1959) as Perkins
 I'm All Right Jack (1959) as Shop Steward
 Libel (1959) as Newspaper Vendor (uncredited)
 Upstairs and Downstairs (1959) as Driver (uncredited)
 The Price of Silence (1960) as Slug
 Sink the Bismarck! (1960) as Civilian Worker on 'Prince of Wales' (uncredited)
 Life Is a Circus (1960) as Removal man
 Dead Lucky (1960) as Harry Winston
 Follow That Horse! (1960) as Farrell
 There Was a Crooked Man (1960) as Foreman
 The House in Marsh Road (1960) as Morris Lumley
 Suspect (1960) as Slater. (Released in the United States as 'The Risk') 
 The Treasure of Monte Cristo (1961) as Albert
 Clue of the Silver Key (1961) as Tickler
 The Iron Maiden (1962) as Fred Carter
 Swallows and Amazons (1963) as Young Billie
 Smokescreen (1964) as Hotel Waiter
 The Projected Man (1966) as Harry Slinger
 Island of Terror (1966) as Constable John Harris
 Smashing Time (1967) as Workman
 The Killing of Sister George (1968) as Taxi Driver (uncredited)
 Till Death Us Do Part (1969) as Fred
 Moon Zero Two (1969) as Barman
 The Last Grenade (1970) (uncredited)
 Too Late the Hero (1970) as Colour-Sergeant
 10 Rillington Place (1971) as Furniture Dealer
 Dad's Army (1971) as Nazi Orderly
 Quest for Love (1971) as Taximan
 Up the Chastity Belt (1971) as Locksmith
 The Magnificent Six and 1/2 (1971) 
 The Alf Garnett Saga (1972) (uncredited)
 My Name is Harry Worth (1972) T.V. Show ( Man with the Flu in Bed )
 Steptoe and Son Ride Again (1973) as Claude
 Confessions of a Window Cleaner (1974) as 1st Removal Man
 Great Expectations (1974) as Arthur Compeyson (scarred convict)
 The Amorous Milkman (1975) as Wilf
 Confessions of a Driving Instructor (1976) as Mr.Gibson (scenes deleted)
 Yesterday's Hero (1979) as Sam Turner
 Danger on Dartmoor (1980)
 The Shillingbury Blowers (1980) as Reggie
 The Mirror Crack'd''' (1980) as Film Technician (uncredited)
 Eye of the Needle'' (1981) as Lock Keeper

References

External links

Sam Kydd on Jonathan Kydd's website
Sam Kydd's profile on the Cherished Television website
Cherished television: Crane
Kydd's son recollections of his father
 Sam Kydd Facebook page

1915 births
1982 deaths
Military personnel from Belfast
British World War II prisoners of war
20th-century British male actors
20th-century male actors from Northern Ireland
British Army personnel of World War II
British male film actors
British male television actors
Respiratory disease deaths in England
Deaths from emphysema
Queen Victoria's Rifles soldiers
Male actors from Belfast
Male actors from London
Oscar Rabin Band members
People educated at Dunstable Grammar School
World War II prisoners of war held by Germany